Meridian House is located on No. 115 Poplar High Street. It was built in 1801-2 by the East India Company, to house the chaplain serving the company's almshouses and chapel. The chapel later became the Church of St Matthias, and Meridian House its vicarage, in 1867. When the church closed in 1976, Meridian House was sold as a private residence. It is a Grade II listed building.

History 
Hugh Greete, a diamond trader for the East India Company, was sent home from India a prisoner in 1618 after allegedly buying diamonds for the company's use but keeping the finest ones for himself. After his death in 1619, the company seized Greete's diamonds and other goods to make up for the fraud. Since Greete's will specified that his estate should be used to make a school or a hospital, the company earmarked the money to build an almshouse for disabled seamen, their widows and orphans.

The almshouse opened in 1628, and it was maintained by a levy on the wages of East India Company employees, known as the Poplar Fund. This fund financed the building of Meridian House.

Architecture 
Meridian House was presumably designed by East India Company surveyor Henry Holland. It is made of stock brick and carries a pediment with the East India Company's arms. A long brick entrance porch was added in 1826, which was removed in 1964 for road widening and replaced by a hood and columns designed by Cecil Brown.

References 

Poplar, London
Properties of the East India Company
Houses in London